Al-Amas is a sub-district located in al-Saddah District, Ibb Governorate, Yemen.Al-Amas had a population of 9811 according to the 2004 census.

References 

Sub-districts in As Saddah District